Robert Stern may refer to:

 Robert Stern (philosopher) (born 1962), professor of philosophy
 Robert A. Stern (neuropsychologist), American neuropsychologist
 Robert A. M. Stern (born 1939), American architect and professor
 Robert J. Stern (born 1951), American geoscientist